Spark (known as Spark: A Space Tail in the United States) is a 2016 computer-animated science fiction adventure comedy film written and directed by Aaron Woodley, and featuring the voices of Jessica Biel, Hilary Swank, Susan Sarandon, Patrick Stewart, Jace Norman and Alan C. Peterson. The film premiered on April 22, 2016, at the Toronto Animation Arts Festival International. It was released on April 14, 2017 in the United States by Open Road Films with distribution sold by Double Dutch International in all international markets except China and South Korea.

Spark got mostly negative reviews, and was a major box-office bomb, earning only $1 million on a $40 million budget.

Plot
Set in a galaxy where anthropomorphic animal and aliens live together, Thirteen years ago, the evil primate General Zhong overthrew his noble brother to seize the throne of the planet Bana, using a spacetime anomaly known as "the slick", which has the ability to create black holes; slicks were made by a wild creature known as a space kraken. The black hole created from the slick partially destroyed Bana, and swallowed up many subjects. Among the few survivors were a baby monkey named Spark, a warrior fox named Vix, and a boar mechanic named Chunk.

In the present, Spark, Vix, Chunk and Spark's forgetful nanny bot, Bananny, secretly live on a shard used as a garbage dump, with Vix and Chunk leading insurgency missions against Zhong, although they constantly forbid Spark from coming along. One day, Spark intercepts an e-mail sent to Vix about a new mission, and decides to take the mission himself without her knowing. The e-mail leads to the Queen of Bana, whom Zhong still permits to live in the palace. After Spark infiltrates the palace and meets the Queen, she hands him a kraken-finder, which Zhong wants to use to find and recapture the space kraken in order to destroy another planet. Spark decides to use it to find the kraken himself; he tames the creature and brings it back to the garbage shard. But he then finds his home raided by Zhong's forces, who then capture both him and the kraken. Zhong forces the kraken to make a new slick into which he hurls Spark, Vix, Chunk and the entire garbage shard.

The trio discover that the slick is actually a wormhole that leads to a desert planet. Vix and Chunk get upset at Spark for causing Zhong to obtain the kraken, and then split up. Spark finds survivors of the first slick, living in the King's old flagship battle cruiser. The Captain of the flagship reveals that Spark is in fact the son of the King and Queen, who entrusted Vix and Chunk to hide and protect him. He also reveals that the King had actually died in an accident some years ago, but Spark has a vision of the King when he visits a memorial to him, and finds a special weapon made for the royal family. Spark then learns from the deceased King that his friends have been captured by giant mutated roaches. Spark, with the help of his father's spirit and his roach friend, Floyd, defeats the mutated roaches and rescues Vix and Chunk. Spark rallies Vix, Chunk, the Captain and his survivors to mount an attack on Zhong, and Chunk figures out a way to use technology to make a slick of their own. In the meantime, Zhong uses the space kraken to intimidate the rest of the galaxy.

The flagship and survivors return to Bana through their own slick, and ultimately defeat Zhong's forces after a prolonged battle. Spark personally rescues the queen from Zhong's own flagship, which gets critically damaged during the battle. Spark decides to rescue his "Uncle" Zhong as well, but the annoyed Queen then punches Zhong into the slick after he "begs" for forgiveness.

The film ends with Spark's friends and allies celebrating him becoming the new Prince of Bana.

Voice cast
 Jace Norman as Spark, The 13 year old son of the queen and the king and the main protagonist of the film
 Jessica Biel as Vix a fox and Spark's caretaker
 Hilary Swank as The Queen, the king’s wife and Spark's mother.
 Susan Sarandon as Bananny, Spark's forgetful nanny robot.
 Patrick Stewart as the Flagship Captain
 Rob deLeeuw as Chunk, Spark's buff boar friend.
 Alan C. Peterson as General Zhong, the main antagonist and Spark's uncle.
 Athena Karkanis as Koko, Zhong's muscular enforcer.
 Jordan Pettle as The King, the queen’s husband and Spark's father
 Ivan Sherry as Announcer
 Evan Taggart as The Artist
 The Director Aaron Woodley voices Floyd, a tiny green cockroach-like alien and Spark's friend.

Production
In January 2015, Deadline Hollywood announced that Jessica Biel, Hilary Swank and Susan Sarandon joined the cast with Aaron Woodley directing, and Red Rover, Gulfstream Pictures and ToonBox Entertainment producing. Woodley would also be writing the screenplay with Doug Hadders and Adam Rotstein.

Release
The film premiered at the Toronto Animation Arts Festival International on April 22, 2016. It was released in the United States by Open Road Films on April 14, 2017. On June 27th, 2017, Universal Home Entertainment released Spark on video.

Reception

Critical response
, on Rotten Tomatoes, the film has an approval rating of 13% based on 23 reviews, with an average review score of 3.8/10.  on Metacritic, it had a score of 22 out of 100, indicating "generally unfavorable reviews".

Box office
Spark opened in 365 theaters in North America and grossed $112,352 in its opening weekend, taking in $308 per theater. The film's total theatrical run brought in $891,925 worldwide, making the film a box office bomb.

See also
 List of computer-animated films
 2016 in film

References

External links

 
 

2016 films
2016 comedy films
2016 fantasy films
2016 science fiction films
2016 computer-animated films
2010s adventure comedy films
2010s coming-of-age comedy films
2010s fantasy adventure films
2010s fantasy comedy films
2010s science fiction adventure films
2010s science fiction comedy films
American adventure comedy films
American children's animated comic science fiction films
American children's animated science fantasy films
American children's animated space adventure films
American coming-of-age comedy films
American computer-animated films
American fantasy adventure films
American fantasy comedy films
Animated coming-of-age films
Animated films about foxes
Canadian adventure comedy films
Canadian animated fantasy films
Canadian animated science fiction films
Canadian children's comedy films
Canadian children's fantasy films
Canadian coming-of-age comedy films
Canadian computer-animated films
Canadian fantasy adventure films
Canadian fantasy comedy films
Animated films about extraterrestrial life
Canadian science fiction comedy films
Animated films about monkeys
Films directed by Aaron Woodley
Films set on fictional planets
Gulfstream Pictures films
Open Road Films animated films
South Korean adventure comedy films
South Korean animated fantasy films
South Korean children's films
South Korean coming-of-age comedy films
Chinese fantasy adventure films
Chinese fantasy comedy films
Chinese animated films
Chinese science fiction comedy films
Chinese children's films
2010s English-language films
2010s Canadian films
2010s American films
2010s South Korean films